Guanacaste can refer to:

 Guanacaste, the common tropical American tree Enterolobium cyclocarpum

Places

Belize
 Guanacaste National Park (Belize), a small national park in Belize

Costa Rica
 Guanacaste Province, a province of Costa Rica
 Guanacaste National Park (Costa Rica), a small national park in Costa Rica
 Guanacaste Cordillera a mountain range in Costa Rica